Narvel James Crawford, Jr. (born November 9, 1929) is a former Democratic member of the North Carolina House of Representatives.

The son of Narvel James, Sr. and Tymah (née Phillips) Crawford and a native of Asheville, Crawford is an alumnus of Duke University and the University of North Carolina at Chapel Hill. He served in the United States Army from 1954 to 1956 in the Counter Intelligence Corps.

He was elected to the House in 1981 for the 51st district and served until 1995.

A property manager, Crawford has also held positions as Director of the Asheville Chamber of Commerce, North Carolina Hemophilia Foundation, American Foundation for the Deaf, Epilepsy Association of North Carolina and American Lung Association of North Carolina. He is a member of an Episcopal church, and the fraternity Phi Beta Kappa.

References

1929 births
North Carolina Democrats
Duke University alumni
University of North Carolina at Chapel Hill alumni
Living people